Corisco is a city in Litoral, Equatorial Guinea. It is located on the island of Corisco and has a (2005 est.) population of 2541.

History
The missionary, Robert Hamill Nassau arrived here for his first posting to Africa.

Demography
The island is inhabited by the Benga people. Some of the women have come from the Kombe people.

References

Populated places in Litoral (Equatorial Guinea)